Saweto, also spelled Soweto, is a small village of mostly Asháninka people in Peru. Located within the Ucayali region, the village lies deep in the Peruvian Amazon, on the Alto Tamaya river, near the Brazilian border. The people of Saweto have engaged in a continuous struggle for official title from the Peruvian government to the land they inhabit. This would help enforce against illegal activities, like logging, and encroachment. The village and its struggle gained widespread national and international media coverage following the murder of Saweto's leader, Edwin Chota, and three others, in September 2014, by illegal loggers as they crossed the Brazilian border to meet with leaders of another – though related – indigenous community.  With increased pressure from the media following these assassinations, the Peruvian government granted legal title to the people of Saweto on January 30, 2015. This land title grants the Asháninka people of Saweto 80,000 hectares, despite strong opposition from pro-logging lobbies, and illegal loggers.

See also
Scott Wallace (photojournalist)
Illegal logging
Mahogany
Indigenous peoples
Indigenous and community conserved area
Rainforest Foundation US

References

External links
Peru at the Climate Crossroads: How Saweto and Indigenous Communities can guide Peru down the right path
Upper Amazon Conservancy - Information on Saweto
Facebook - Title Saweto Campaign Page
Facebook - Title Saweto Campaign Page

Illegal logging
Upper Amazon
Indigenous rights organizations in South America